The 2010 K League, officially known as Sonata K-League 2010, was the 28th season of the K League. It was sponsored by Hyundai Motor Company, and was held from 27 February to 5 December 2010.

The K League match-fixing scandal, the biggest incident in history of South Korean football, occurred in this season, and was revealed in 2011. 15 matches were fixed by 47 players, and they were banned for life from working in football.

Teams

General information

Managerial changes

Regular season

League table

Positions by matchday

Results

Championship playoffs

Bracket

Final table

Player statistics

Top scorers

Top assist providers

Awards

Main awards
The K League Players' Player of the Year was published by Korean edition of FourFourTwo in summer, and was not an official award of the K League, but 148 players participated in the selection process.

Source:

Best XI

Source:

Attendance

Source: K League

See also
2010 in South Korean football
2010 K League Championship
2010 Korean League Cup
2010 Korean FA Cup
2011 South Korean football match-fixing scandal

References

External links
Official website 
Review at K League 

K League seasons
1
South Korea
South Korea